The Malayan snail-eating turtle (Malayemys macrocephala) is a species of turtle in Malayemys genus of the family Geoemydidae.

Distribution
The Malayan snail-eating turtle is found in the Cambodia, Myanmar, west Malaysia and Thailand (coastal southeastern and central of Chao Phraya and Mae Klong basins).

Physical Characteristics
The Malayan snail-eating turtle has the basic freshwater turtle characteristics to represent an animal model when it comes to developmental biology. Females grow to have prominently larger heads than males. Those with large heads and other particular functions are fitted to diets including predominantly molluscs.

References

Bibliography
 
 
Malayemys macrocephala, The Reptile Database
 Kitana, J., Kitana, N., & Pewphong, R. (2020). Chronology of Gonadal Development in the Malayan Snail-eating Turtle Malayemys macrocephala. Zoological Studies, 59(20). 
 Dawson, E.J., Ihlow, F., Ettmar, S., Paul van Dijk, P. (2018). Malayemys macrocephala (Gray 1859) – Malayan Snail-Eating Turtle, Rice-Field Terrapin. Conservation Biology of Freshwater Turtles and Tortoises: A Compilation Project of the IUCN/SSC Tortoise and Freshwater Turtle Specialist Group. Chelonian Research Foundation and Turtle Conservancy. 10.3854/crm.5.108.macrocephala.v1.2018	

Geoemydidae
Turtles of Asia
Reptiles of Southeast Asia
Reptiles of Cambodia
Reptiles of Malaysia
Reptiles of Myanmar
Reptiles of Thailand
Reptiles described in 1859
Taxa named by John Edward Gray